Ivan Brown (born July 18, 1985) is a professional Canadian football defensive end who is a free agent. He was drafted by the Montreal Alouettes in the fourth round of the 2009 CFL Draft. He has also been a member of the Hamilton Tiger-Cats, Toronto Argonauts, Winnipeg Blue Bombers and Saskatchewan Roughriders. He played CIS football for the Saskatchewan Huskies.

External links
Winnipeg Blue Bombers bio 
Toronto Argonauts bio

1985 births
Living people
Canadian football defensive linemen
Hamilton Tiger-Cats players
Montreal Alouettes players
Players of Canadian football from Saskatchewan
Saskatchewan Huskies football players
Sportspeople from Regina, Saskatchewan
Toronto Argonauts players
Winnipeg Blue Bombers players
Saskatchewan Roughriders players